2010–11 Estonian Cup is the twenty-first season of the Estonian football knockout tournament organized by the Estonian Football Association. On 10 May 2011, FC Flora Tallinn defeated JK Narva Trans in the final to win the cup and qualify for the second qualifying round of the 2011–12 UEFA Europa League. The defending champions were FC Levadia Tallinn.

First round
The first round pairs were drawn by Estonian Football Association on 2 June 2010. A total of 96 teams registered for the competition, a new competition record.

Teams with bye

 A&A Kinnisvara
 Alko
 Ararat-TTÜ
 Aspen
 Emmaste
 Flora
 Ganvix
 HaServ
 Igiliikur
 Jalgpallihaigla
 Järva-Jaani
 Nõmme Kalju
 Kalju II
 Kuressaare
 Levadia
 Lootos
 Luunja
 Paide
 Puuma
 Rakvere II
 Saku
 Saue
 Suema Cargobus
 Tabasalu
 Tallinna Kalev
 Tallinna Kalev III
 Tamme Auto
 Tammeka
 Tammeka II
 Twister
 Tääksi
 Võru

Second round
These matches occurred between 3 August and 4 September 2010.

|}
Notes:1This match originally ended 2–4 in favor of Rakvere. Later, it was discovered that Võru had fielded an ineligible player during the match. Therefore, this match was awarded to Rakvere 0–4.

Third round
These matches occurred between 31 August and 7 October 2010.

Fourth round
The 16 winners from the previous round competed in this stage of the competition. These matches took place between 5 and 20 October 2010.

Quarterfinals
The 8 winners from the previous round competed in this stage of the competition. However, before this round took place, Raasiku FC Joker withdrew from the competition, meaning that Flora moved on to the semifinals automatically. These matches took place on 12 and 13 April 2011.

Semifinals
The 4 winners from the previous round competed in this stage of the competition.

Final

References

External links
 Official website 

Estonian Cup seasons
Cup
Cup
Estonian